Pyrenula is a genus of lichen-forming fungi in the family Pyrenulaceae. The genus has a widespread distribution, especially in tropical regions, and contains about 200 species.

See also
 List of Pyrenula species

References

Eurotiomycetes genera
Lichen genera
 
Taxa named by Erik Acharius
Taxa described in 1814